Etz Chaim Yeshiva (Etz Chaim is Hebrew for "Tree of Life") may refer to several educational institutions (Hebrew: yeshiva):

Etz Chaim Yeshiva (Brooklyn)  (Boro Park)
Etz Chaim Center for Jewish Learning
Etz Chaim Yeshiva (Jerusalem)
Etz Chaim Yeshiva (London)
Etz Chaim Yeshiva (Maltsch)
Etz Chaim Yeshiva (Manhattan) (See Yeshiva University)
Etz Chaim Yeshiva (Toronto)
Eitz Chaim Schools
Etz Chaim Yeshiva (Volozhin)

Etz Chaim Yeshiva (Slutsk, Kletsk)

See also
Etz Hayim (disambiguation)